CH-16 was a  of the Imperial Japanese Navy during World War II.

History
CH-16 was built by Nippon Kokan K. K. at their Tsurumi shipyard, laid down on 22 April 1940, launched on 19 November 1940, and completed and commissioned on 5 April 1941, and attached to the Yokosuka Naval District. SCD 21 was at the time assigned to Rear Admiral Hirose Sueto's 2nd Base Force under Vice Admiral Ibō Takahashi's Third Fleet.

On 4 July 1944, CH-16 was attacked and sunk off the Bonin Islands near Chichi-jima by carrier-based aircraft from Rear Admiral Joseph J. Clark's Task Group 38.1 and Rear Admiral Ralph E. Davison's Task Group 38.4. CH-16 was struck from the Navy List on 10 September 1944.

References

Additional references
 
 
 

1941 ships
No.13-class submarine chasers
Ships sunk by US aircraft
Maritime incidents in July 1944
World War II shipwrecks in the Pacific Ocean